The 329th Infantry Regiment is a unit of the United States Army. During World War I and World War II. It was part of the 83rd Infantry Division.

World War II
During World War II, Lt. Sam Magill facilitated the mass surrender of 20,000 German troops on the banks of the Loire River on 17 September 1944.

Brigadier General John Mauldin was the regimental surgeon during World War II. He took more than 400 photographs between the time the unit landed in England eight days after D-Day until Germany was liberated in 1945.

General George Patton reviewed the 329th and concluded "That’s the finest body of soldiers I have ever seen in the field."

The 329th Infantry Regiment was the closest US unit to Berlin at the end of World War II, being ordered to stop some 30 miles short of the city.

Lineage
Constituted 5 August 1917 in the National Army (USA) as the 329th Infantry and assigned to the 83rd Division

Organized 30 August 1917 at Camp Sherman, Ohio

Demobilized 15 February 1919 at Camp Sherman, Ohio

Reconstituted 24 June 1921 in the Organized Reserves as the 329th Infantry and assigned to the 83rd Division (later redesignated as the 83rd Infantry Division)

Organized in December 1921 with headquarters at Dayton, Ohio

Ordered into active military service 15 August 1942 and reorganized at Camp Atterbury, Indiana

Inactivated 6 April 1946 at Camp Kilmer, New Jersey

Activated 1 October 1946 with headquarters at Indianapolis, Indiana

(Organized Reserves redesignated 25 March 1948 as the Organized Reserve Corps; redesignated 9 July 1952 as the Army Reserve)

Relieved 1 March 1952 from assignment to the 83d Infantry Division and assigned to the 70th Infantry Division (United States)

Reorganized and redesignated 1 May 1959 as the 329th Regiment, an element of the 70th Division (Training), with headquarters at Detroit, Michigan

(Location of headquarters changed 7 April 1966 to Fraser, Michigan)

Reorganized 31 January 1968 to consist of the 1st and 3d Battalions, elements of the 70th Division (Training)

Reorganized 1 September 1971 to consist of the 1st, 2d, and 3d Battalions, elements of the 70th Division (Training)

Reorganized 1 October 1994 to consist of the 1st, 2d, and 3d Battalions, elements of the 70th Division (Institutional Training)

Reorganized 13 January 1995 to consist of the 1st and 2d Battalions, elements of the 70th Division (Institutional Training)

Reorganized 16 October - 16 November 1996 to consist of the 1st and 2d Battalions, elements of the 84th Division (Institutional Training)

Reorganized 1 October 2004 to consist of the 1st and 2d Battalions, elements of the 100th Division (Institutional Training)

Restructured on 15 January 2014 to be an Observer Controller/Trainer battalion under the 2nd Operations brigade under the 86th Training Division and the 84th Training Command

Distinctive unit insignia
 Description
A Gold color metal and enamel device  in height consisting of a shield blazoned: Argent, on a pile Sable a fleur-de-lis Or. Attached around the bottom and sides of the shield a Gold scroll inscribed "NOUS GARDONS" in Black letters.
 Symbolism
White is the old Infantry color; the black pile is the background of the shoulder sleeve insignia of the 83d Division and the gold fleur-de-lis indicates the organization’s service in France. The motto translates to "We Guard."
 Background
The distinctive unit insignia was originally approved for the 329th Infantry Regiment on 7 May 1927. It was redesignated for the 329th Regiment on 22 August 1960.

Coat of arms
Blazon
 Shield- Argent, on a pile Sable a fleur-de-lis Or.
 Crest- That for the regiments and separate battalions of the Army Reserve: On a wreath of the colors Argent and Sable the Lexington Minute Man Proper. The statue of the Minute Man, Captain John Parker (H.H. Kitson, sculptor), stands on the Common in Lexington, Massachusetts.
 Motto NOUS GARDONS (We Guard).
 Symbolism
 Shield- White is the old Infantry color; the black pile is the background of the shoulder sleeve insignia of the 83d Division and the gold fleur-de-lis indicates the organization’s service in France.
 Crest- The crest is that of the United States Army Reserve.
 Background- The coat of arms was originally approved for the 329th Infantry Regiment on 27 June 1925. It was redesignated for the 329th Regiment on 22 August 1960.

Current configuration
 1st Battalion 329th Infantry Regiment (United States) (Training)
 2nd Battalion 329th Infantry Regiment (United States)
 3rd Battalion 329th Infantry Regiment (United States)
 4th Battalion 329th Infantry Regiment (United States)

Campaign participation credit
 World War I: Streamer without inscription
 World War II: Normandy; Northern France; Rhineland; Ardennes-Alsace; Central Europe

Decorations
2d Battalion entitled to:
Presidential Unit Citation (Army) for GURZENICH

See also
 United States Army branch insignia

References

 Historical register and dictionary of the United States Army, from ..., Volume 1 By Francis Bernard Heitman 
 Official U. S. bulletin, Volume 1 By United States (1917). Committee on Public Information 
 Encyclopedia of United States Army insignia and uniforms By William K. Emerson (page 51).

External links
 http://www.history.army.mil/html/forcestruc/lineages/branches/inf/default.htm
 http://www.history.army.mil/html/forcestruc/lineages/branches/div/default.htm
 https://web.archive.org/web/20110911191248/http://www.tioh.hqda.pentagon.mil/UniformedServices/crossed_musket.aspx
New Infantry Training Brigade battalion starts training

329
1917 establishments in Ohio